King Huai of Chu (died 296 BC) was from 328 to 299 BC the king of the state of Chu during the Warring States period of ancient China.  He was born Xiong Huai and King Huai (懷, a different Chinese character) was his posthumous title.

King Huai succeeded his father King Wei of Chu, who died in 329 BCE.  In 299 BCE King Huai was trapped and held hostage by King Zhao of Qin when he went to the state of Qin for negotiation, and his son King Qingxiang of Chu ascended the throne.  King Huai managed to escape but was recaptured by Qin.  Three years later, he died in captivity.

One of his grandsons was later reinstated as King of Chu as the Qin dynasty descended into chaos, also under the name "King Huai of Chu"; this grandson was later known as Emperor Yi of Chu.

Culture

King Huai's historical fame is especially due to the poetry of Qu Yuan, and other early Classical Chinese poetry, as preserved in the Chu ci: particularly and seminally the poem "Li Sao" (sometimes translated as "Encountering Sorrow") is thought to reflect the political and personal relationships between Qu Yuan or the poet writing in his persona and King Huai. The main themes of "Li Sao" and the poems of the Sao genre include Qu Yuan's falling victim to intrigues in the court of Chu, his resulting exile, his desire to nevertheless remain pure and untainted by the corruption that was rife in the court, and his lamentations at the gradual decline of the once-powerful state of Chu. At the very end the poet, resigned, states his resolve to die, by drowning in the river.

In fiction and popular culture
 Portrayed by Peng Bo in The Qin Empire II: Alliance (2012).
 Portrayed by Cao Zheng in The Legend of Mi Yue (2015).

See also
Chu Ci
"Nine Regrets"
Qin's wars of unification
Qu Yuan

Notes

References
Hawkes, David, translation, introduction, and notes (2011 [1985]). Qu Yuan et al., The Songs of the South: An Ancient Chinese Anthology of Poems by Qu Yuan and Other Poets. London: Penguin Books. 

Monarchs of Chu (state)
Chinese kings
4th-century BC Chinese monarchs
296 BC deaths
Year of birth unknown
3rd-century BC Chinese monarchs